Players and pairs who neither have high enough rankings nor receive wild cards may participate in a qualifying tournament held one week before the annual Wimbledon Tennis Championships.

Seeds

  Jana Kandarr /  Trudi Musgrave (first round)
  Samantha Reeves /  Mashona Washington (qualifying competition, lucky losers)
  Jelena Dokic /  Tina Pisnik (qualified)
  Barbara Schwartz /  Patricia Wartusch (first round)

Qualifiers

  Julia Abe /  Nadia Petrova
  Jelena Dokić /  Tina Pisnik

Lucky losers

  Alina Jidkova /  Larissa Schaerer
  Samantha Reeves /  Mashona Washington

Qualifying draw

First qualifier

Second qualifier

External links

1999 Wimbledon Championships on WTAtennis.com
1999 Wimbledon Championships – Women's draws and results at the International Tennis Federation

Women's Doubles Qualifying
Wimbledon Championship by year – Women's doubles qualifying
Wimbledon Championships